Narsipatnam Road railway station (station code:NRP), is an Indian Railways station in Visakhapatnam district of Andhra Pradesh. It is situated on Vijayawada–Gudur section of Howrah–Chennai main line and is administered under Vijayawada railway division of South Central Railway zone. It is 152nd most busiest railway station in India.

History 
Between 1893 and 1896,  of the East Coast State Railway, between Vijayawada and Cuttack was opened for traffic. The southern part of the East Coast State Railway (from Waltair to Vijayawada) was taken over by Madras Railway in 1901.

Classification 
In terms of earnings and outward passengers handled, Narsipatnam Road is categorized as a Non-Suburban Grade-5 (NSG-5) railway station. Based on the re–categorization of Indian Railway stations for the period of 2017–18 and 2022–23, an NSG–5 category station earns between – crore and handles  passengers.

Station amenities 

It is one of the 38 stations in the division to be equipped with Automatic Ticket Vending Machines (ATVMs).

References

External links 

Railway stations in Visakhapatnam district
Railway stations in Vijayawada railway division